Mathiang Mathiang (born 19 September 1994) is a South Sudanese professional footballer who plays as a defender for Australian NPL Victoria 2 club Brunswick City SC and the South Sudan national team.

References

External links

1994 births
Living people
People from Kassala (state)
People with acquired South Sudanese citizenship
South Sudanese footballers
Association football defenders
South Sudan international footballers
Sudanese emigrants to Australia
Naturalised citizens of Australia
Australian soccer players
Stirling Macedonia FC players
Floreat Athena FC players
Heidelberg United FC players
National Premier Leagues players